WKUW-LD (channel 40) is a low-power television station licensed to White House, Tennessee, United States, serving the Nashville television market. Owned by HC2 Holdings, it is a sister station to Bowling Green, Kentucky–licensed WCTZ-LD (channel 35), which also serves Nashville. WKUW-LD's transmitter is located in Whites Creek, Tennessee, just off I-24 and Old Hickory Boulevard.

History

As a TBN translator in Bowling Green
Originally licensed to Bowling Green, the station began broadcasting on October 17, 2002, as a TBN owned-and-operated translator station, under the call sign W60DC, and was relaying network programming from TBN flagship KTBN-TV of Santa Ana, California.

On October 5, 2004, TBN announced they were selling the translator to Budd Broadcasting. The sale was finalized on December 1, 2004. A year later, on June 9, 2005, Budd Broadcasting changed the call sign to WKUW-LP. The station continued to air TBN programming.

The silent years and relocation to Nashville
On December 31, 2010, Budd Broadcasting took WKUW off the air temporarily to upgrade the station to digital operations. In the process, the station turned off its analog signal on channel 60 and signed on a digital signal on channel 40. Through the use of PSIP, digital television receivers display the station's virtual channel as its current UHF digital channel 40 rather than its former analog channel 60; this channel was among the high band UHF channels (52–69) that were removed from broadcasting use when the digital transition in the United States saw the switchover from analog to exclusively digital broadcasting of terrestrial television programming in June 2009. The call sign was also changed to WKUW-LD.

DTV America ownership
In 2015, it was announced that WKUW-LD and silent Bowling Green sister station WKUT-LD (now operating as an Azteca América O&O station for the Louisville market) would be operated by DTV America Corporation, alongside then-Antenna TV/MyNetworkTV dual affiliate WCZU-LD in Bowling Green (now a Court TV affiliate). On July 17, 2015, DTV America took full control of WKUW and now owns and operates the station outright.

WKUW-LD returned to the air on November 23 as an affiliate of the Doctor Television Channel (DrTV). The station now transmits from a tower near Whites Creek close to the Interstate 24 interchange with Old Hickory Boulevard, sharing tower space with television stations WUXP, WNTU-LD, WPGD, WRTN-LD, and WJNK-LD, and radio station WGFX.

On December 8, 2015, WKUW changed affiliations from DrTV to Buzzr—a network broadcasting mostly classic TV game shows. WKUW was supposed to add DrTV to a forthcoming second subchannel, however, this never happened. Instead, The Liquidation Channel (now Shop LC) was added to its second subchannel on January 27, 2016. WKUW also launched a third subchannel as an affiliate of Escape (now Ion Mystery) on the same day.

On April 1, 2016, WKUW added Newsmax TV on DT4 and QVC Over the Air on DT6. The fifth subchannel was silent until April 13, 2016, when it returned with The Country Network. It was discontinued on January 11, 2017, and replaced with a full-time feed from the Sinclair-owned American Sports Network (ASN). On September 6, 2017, ASN was folded into Stadium, a multi-platform sports network.

In May 2016, Newsmax TV was dropped from DT4 and replaced with The Country Network. QVC Plus replaced the Country Network on DT5.

On November 1, 2016, the full-time Retro TV network replaced Escape, which moved to WSMV-TV's second subchannel of 4.2 replacing Heartland.

In December 2016, WKUW added a seventh digital subchannel carrying infomercials, under the "Revenue Frontier" branding; however, on February 1, 2018, the infomercials were replaced with Jewelry Television (JTV).

Under HC2 ownership
WKUW was one of several dozen DTV America stations that were purchased by HC2 Holdings in October 2017.

On February 28, 2018, The Country Network was replaced with Quest on DT4. On October 1, 2018, WKUW added CBN News Channel to its sixth subchannel, replacing QVC. 

On March 5, 2019, WKUW discontinued Stadium from its third subchannel and QVC2 from its fifth subchannel; both networks were replaced with infomercials. On April 8, 2019, infomercials were replaced on DT3 by the Soul of the South Network. This marked the return of the network to Nashville where it had been aired previously by WJDE-LD's channel 31.2.

As a WJFB translator
On the weekend of September 21, 2019, WKUW-LD eliminated all of its channels and underwent a channel reconstructing. WKUW-LD ran a test pattern on its main channel while Heroes & Icons was added on 40.2, Start TV on 40.3, Decades on 40.4 and Movies! on 40.5. This mirrored the channel lineup of then-sister station WJFB, although it continued to run Tri-State Christian Television (TCT) on its sixth subchannel and Light TV on its seventh subchannel until 2020. WKUW-LD became a WJFB translator on September 23. The former WKUW-LD affiliations which include Buzzr, Shop LC, Soul of the South Network, Quest, Revenue Frontier, CBN News Channel and Jewelry Television continued to be seen on sister station WCTZ-LD (which itself was a former translator of WKUW-LD).

As a WCTZ-LD translator
On May 30, 2021, WKUW-LD dropped the simulcast of WJFB's five digital subchannels and switched back to simulcasting the seven subchannels on WCTZ-LD, making WKUW-LD a translator station to WCTZ-LD once again.

Shift back to a non-translator station
On July 23, 2021, WKUW-LD would shift away from being a translator of WCTZ-LD and return to being a stand-alone station, and would drop its fifth, sixth and seventh subchannels, therefore going back down to only four.

Technical information

Subchannels
The station's digital signal is multiplexed:

Spectrum reallocation
In 2017, due to the FCC's 2016 incentive auction, WKUW filed for a construction permit for its digital subchannel to relocate to digital UHF channel 28 due to spectrum re-packing. Channels will be changing over a transition period, which will take place between September 7, 2019, and October 18, 2019. However, on October 19, 2018, WKUW went off the air temporarily to prepare for the transition and relocation to UHF channel 28. WKUW-LD returned to the air briefly on January 30, 2019, and went off the air again at 3:25 p.m. that day after testing its signal in preparation for its permanent return. WKUW-LD officially returned to the air on UHF channel 28 on February 1, 2019 at 1:30 p.m.

References

External links
WKUW-LD REC Broadcast Query

Television channels and stations established in 2002
KUW-LD
Low-power television stations in the United States
Innovate Corp.